The Society for the Restoration of Orthodox Christianity in the Caucasus was an organisation in late Tsarist Russia to spread Christianity in the Caucasus after it was completely conquered by Tsarist Russia in the 19th century

History 
As a Christian state, Tsarist Russia had already had the experience of converting the local population to Christianity, before the Russian conquest of Azerbaijan, across the states it conquered, especially, those inhabited by Moslems. From the mid-16th century, the Russian empire (under Tsar Ivan IV) aimed to pursue a foreign policy of conquering new territories and forcefully Christianizing indigenous people throughout these territories. During the invasion of the khanates of Kazan (1552) and Astrakhan (1556), as well as Siberia, Tsarist Russia consolidated power in these occupied territories, using that exact method of Christianizing the locals and exploiting religious divisions.

The policy of evangelizing the locals from the Jar-Balakan Community and the Elisu Sultanate was carried out by means of the same methods as those used for the locals across Kazan, Astrakhan and Siberia. There were only two differences here:

 The original intent was to evangelize Ingiloys, not the entire population of the Jar-Balakan communities.
 The Georgian Church played the role of the Russian Orthodox Church in spreading Christianity to Azerbaijan.

On August 18, 1851, Major-General Knyaz Mukhransky who served as the assistant chief of Zagatala province proposed that Ingiloys be exempted from taxes and duties in exchange for the conversion to Christianity, and that each Ingiloy family be rewarded with 15 -30 rubles in silver. This proposal was immediately welcomed by the tsarist authorities. On November 7, 1851, the Caucasian Viceroy (namestnik) Mikhail Vorontsov issued a special order to exempt the Ingiloys to be Christianized from the life and fireplace taxes they had to pay to the state treasury. In 1851, it was consequently possible to convert 1,133 Ingiloys to Christianity in Jar-Balakan. As a result of this Christianization policy, Gakh, Goragan, Meshabash, Kotuklu, and Alibeyli, which were once part of the Elisu Sultanate, were the first Christianized (orthodoxized) villages inhabited by Ingiloys. The locals from the villages of Suskend and Shotavar refused to be Christianized. Soon, first churches were built in Gakh and Goragan.

How the Society was founded 
With Tsarist Russia's complete invasion of the Caucasus, in 1860, the Society for the Restoration of Orthodox Christianity in the Caucasus was established to spread Christianity throughout the Caucasus by the initiative of the Exarch of Georgia and Metropolitan of Kartli-Kakheti Isidor and through the efforts of the Viceroy of the Caucasus Prince Alexander Ivanovich Baryatinsky. The Society, founded by order of Russia's Tsar on June 9, 1860, was patronized by Empress of Russia Maria Alexandrovna herself. During its activity, the Society had spent 1.475.482 rubles to spread Christianity to the Caucasus, including Northwest Azerbaijan. It was headquartered in Tbilisi.

The core duties of the Society was to build and maintain churches, to carry servants, to open new schools for local children, to compile alphabets of local languages, to translate religious books into local languages, and to train priests or missioners elected from amongst locals.

In order to run the Society, firstly, a central office and temporary management committee was set up in Tbilisi. The Temporary Committee reserved the right to make decisions on which provinces of the Caucasus, and how, to function. Prince Alexander Baryatinsky, Evseviy, Exarch of Georgia, member of the governorship board A.Fadeyev and member of the state council Insarski were elected as members of the committee. In 1861, Archpriest Ioakim Romanov was also elected as a member.

Churches built in Azerbaijan 
 Allahverdi Church
 Kurmuk Church
 Saint Nino Church
 St George's Church, Qakh
 Kotokli Church

References

External links 
 In 1910, the Society released an album to celebrate its 50th anniversary. 
 List of society members, school teachers under the Society and church clergies

Christian organizations
Russian Orthodox Church
Organizations established in 1860
Organizations disestablished in 1917